The Sheep Gate is a town gate in Trim, Ireland. It is a National Monument.

History

The Sheep Gate is the only surviving gate of five that once provided access to Trim. The town wall and its gates were built in the 13th or 14th century. Sheep Gate may have been so named as a toll was charged here for sheep being brought in to be sold at market: in 1290, the murage and pavage tax was one penny per ten sheep, reduced to a farthing in 1308. The name could also derive from the archaic meaning of cheap, meaning "market" (cf. Cheapside). This name is not recorded before the 19th century; it may have been known as the Porch Gate, possibly from French porte ("door"), which may also give its name to the Porch Fields lying outside the city walls. The gate was locked between 9 p.m. and 4 a.m.

The gate

The gate was the southeastern entrance to the town, and is located just north of the River Boyne. Sheep Gate survives as a stone archway.

References

National Monuments in County Meath
Trim, County Meath
City gates